Patrik Sailer (born 28 June 1989) is a Slovak football defender who currently plays for PFK Piešťany.

References

External links
Profile FC Nitra

1989 births
Living people
Slovak footballers
Association football defenders
FC Nitra players
PFK Piešťany players
Slovak Super Liga players